Events from the year 1672 in the Dutch Republic

Events

 Siege of Groningen
 Siege of Groenlo
 Battle of Solebay
 Rampjaar

Births

Deaths
January 21 – Adriaen van de Velde,  painter (b. 1636)
August 20 
Cornelis de Witt, politician (b. 1623)
Johan de Witt, politician (b. 1625)
October 8 – Johan Nieuhof, traveler who wrote about his journeys to Brazil (b. 1618)
November 16 – Esaias Boursse, painter (b. 1631)
November 19 – Franciscus Sylvius, physician and scientist (b. 1614)
December 30 – Hendrick Bloemaert, painter (b. 1601)

References

1672 in the Dutch Republic
1670s in the Dutch Republic
Years of the 17th century in the Dutch Republic